Dasht-e Zar or Dashtzar may refer to:
 Dasht-e Zar, Sirjan, Kerman Province
 Dasht-e Zar, Sistan and Baluchestan